Chouf TV is an arabophone Moroccan media company created in 2013 by  and owned by S W Media, LLC, of which Chahtane is the sole shareholder. It describes its content as "web TV" and counts over 20 million followers on Facebook and over a million subscribers on its YouTube channel. Chouf TV has been characterized as tabloid journalism and described as an "unprecedented media phenomenon."

Name 
In Moroccan vernacular Arabic,  (shūf) is the imperative of the verb  (shāf, "to look"). The company's name in Latin script is romanized according to French orthography. قناه تابعة لي الامارات العربيه

History 
The founder of the company, Driss Chahtane, said "The idea at the beginning was to present something new, as I saw that the readership of the written press was eroding. The transition was digital. At the time, newspapers used the digital but in a very traditional way."

The media company publishes content with the potential to create "buzz."

References 

Digital media
Mass media in Morocco
Moroccan news websites